Surrey (also Surry) is the easternmost and the smallest by area of the three historic counties into which Jamaica is divided.  It was created in 1758, and is divided into four parishes.

History
Jamaica's three counties (Surrey, Middlesex and Cornwall) were established in 1758 to facilitate the holding of courts along the lines of the British county court system. Surrey was named after the English county in which Kingston upon Thames is found. Kingston was its county town.

Parish

(1) Kingston Parish and Saint Andrew Parish together form Kingston and St Andrew Corporation.
(2) Kingston Parish does not encompass all of Kingston.

References

Counties of Jamaica
1758 establishments in the British Empire